JetFighter: The Adventure is a 1988 video game published by Velocity Development for MS-DOS.

Gameplay
JetFighter: The Adventure is a game in which a modern air combat simulator has 32 missions in addition to the training missions.

Reception
Daniel Hockman reviewed the game for Computer Gaming World, and stated that "Although this first offering from Velocity shows a few rough edges, it is a very, very good product. The blazing fast state of the art animation is unsurpassed. Should your Defense Department approve the acquisition of this weapon system? Affirmative!"

Reviews
The One - Mar, 1989
The Games Machine - May, 1989
ASM (Aktueller Software Markt) - Jul, 1989
Computer Gaming World - Jun, 1991

References

1988 video games
Cold War video games
Combat flight simulators
DOS games
DOS-only games
Video games developed in the United States
Video games set in the United States